Carabiniere was a frigate operated by the Italian Navy. Launched in 1967, the vessel served in the anti-submarine role during the Cold War until 1992. The ship was then recommissioned as a testing platform for new weapons systems, including Aster, finally retiring in 2008.

Design
The second ship in the class, Climene, was laid down in 1963 but was renamed Carabiniere in June 1965 prior to being launched in 1967. Carabiniere was the third vessel in Italian service to be so named.

Armament
As originally designed, Climene was to have armament based on the preceding . Optimised for anti-submarine warfare, the vessel was designed around a hangar for an Agusta-Bell AB.204 helicopter. Close-in anti-submarine defence was provided by six  Mark 44 torpedoes launched from Mark 32 torpedo tubes complemented by a single-barrel  Menon mortar mounted forward. An early drawing shows the hangar straddled by a pair of  guns with a single  gun mounted fore and aft to provide anti-aircraft defence. By 1962, the efficacy of the 40 mm was in doubt and the design was redrawn with three 76 mm guns, but even this was deemed insufficient.  At launch, the vessel had no less than six single mounts.

Propulsion
The propulsion system used a combined diesel and gas (CODAG) system as first trialled on the destroyer . Two diesels and one gas turbine were allied per shaft with a hydraulic coupling to enable the vessel to either run on diesel power alone, at low speed, or diesels, at high speed, and gas turbines simultaneously.

Service

Anti-submarine frigate

Commissioned on 28 April 1968, Carabiniere served with the 1º Gruppo Navale d'Altura based at La Spezia. In 1973, when the school ship Amerigo Vespucci was inactive due to maintenance, Carabiniere was one of a number of Italian naval vessels used as a summer school cruise ship for students at the Italian Naval Academy. The vessel subsequently visited Istanbul, Odessa and Sevastopol alongside the destroyer .

During the 1970s, the ship was updated.  The helicopters were replaced by the more capable AB-212ASW and a SLQ-A ECM system was added. The ship was further upgraded in the 1980s. Hull-mounted sonar and the SLQ-747 ECM suite was fitted.

Weapons testing ship
On 1 April 1992, the ship was decommissioned and re-equipped as a testing platform for a new generation of Italian naval weapons such as Aster and MILAS. The gas turbine, Menon mortar, variable depth sonar and five 76 mm mounts, along with two fire control radars, were removed. Helicopter operating capability was also disabled. A SPY-702 search radar was installed along with Sylver missile launchers. The most obvious change was the installation of a large antenna midships for the EMPAR radar (also known as AN/SPY-790) which used the space previously occupied by the gas turbine exhaust. This combination of systems enabled Carabiniere to act as a testbed for PAAMS and SAAM-IT.

Carabiniere re-entered service on 31 December 1994 as a dedicated test ship but retained the penant designation of a frigate. The vessel undertook successful live firing trials of both Aster 15 from Sylver A-43 launchers and Aster 30 from Sylver A-50 launchers.

Carabiniere was finally decommissioned on 19 November 2008 in the presence of the Naval Chief of Staff Paolo La Rosa and Head of the Carabiniere Gianfrancesco Siazzu.

References

External links
 Carabiniere (F 581) Marina Militare website
 

1967 ships
Alpino-class frigates
Ships built in Italy
Frigates of the Cold War